Divisional General José María Bartolomé Imbert Duplessis (né Joseph Marie Barthélemy Imbert; (24 August 1798 in  (now Le Plessis-Grammoire), Maine-et-Loire (Pays de la Loire), France – 14 May 1847 in Puerto Plata, Dominican Republic) was a French-born Dominican military figure and a mayor of Moca.

Biography 
José María Imbert was born as Joseph-Marie-Barthélemy Imbert in France, to Simon Imbert and Marie Anne du Plessis (from the house of the dukes of Richelieu) in Foudon, in the commune of Le Plessis-Grammoire, in the province of Maine-et-Loire, in the historical duchy of Anjou; he migrated to Moca and married María Francisca del Monte Sánchez (1807–1876) and begat 6 children, among them, Segundo Imbert.

By the beginning of March 1844 Matías Ramón Mella, became Governor of the District of Santiago and Military Chief of the area, and designated José María Imbert from Moca his lieutenant, the second in command of the army in Cibao. On March 29, 1844, the Haitian army of Gen. Jean-Louis Pierrot was approaching Santiago. The commander Matías Ramón Mella is caught out of town recruiting men for the improvised Dominican army will defend the country. José María Imbert managed the defense of the city with the help of Fernando Valerio, Ángel Antonio Reyes, and José María López. Imbert's role on the Battle of Santiago was crucial for the crushing victory over the Haitian Army. In 1845, Imbert being a lieutenant of Francisco Antonio Salcedo, he fought the Haitians in Beler defeating them again. Finished that campaign, he rejoined Moca, as Commander of Arms. From there he went to the same office at Puerto Plata, where he died in 1847.

He is buried at the Cathedral of Santiago, along with other heroes of the Independence and the Restoration Wars.

See also 
Segundo Imbert               
Antonio Imbert Barrera       
Carmen Imbert Brugal         
José María Cabral (director) 
Furcy Fondeur              
Pedro Eugenio Pelletier

References 

1798 births
1847 deaths
People from Maine-et-Loire
Dominican Republic people of French descent
French emigrants to the Dominican Republic
People of the Dominican War of Independence
Dominican Republic military personnel
Dominican Republic independence activists
Mayors of places in the Dominican Republic